Ambulacrum is an architectural word that denotes an atrium, courtyard, or parvise in front of a basilica or church that is surrounded by arcades or colonnades, or trees, and which often contains a fountain. It also can denote a walking path that trees delineate.

References
James Stevens Curl, A Dictionary of Architecture and Landscape Architecture (Oxford University Press, 2006).

Architectural elements